

Transportation canals 
Intracoastal Waterway
Houston Ship Channel
Sabine–Neches Waterway

Irrigation canals 
See Texas Irrigation Canals
Franklin Canal (Texas)
Riverside Canal (El Paso)
American Canal

See also
Sheep Creek

 
Texas
Canals
Canals
Canals